Sarah Craig Ferguson ( – 14 September 2022) was a Jersey politician. 

Sarah studied at Manchester University, graduating with a degree in Electrical Engineering and took her MBA at Columbia University Graduate School of Business in New York City, majoring in Finance and accountancy with a minor in marketing.

She worked in manufacturing, retail, finance, compliance but spent the major part of her career in finance concluding as a Senior banking supervisor at the Financial Services Commission. In her spare time she also served as a Constables Officer and later as a Centenier in St Brelade.

. She was a member of the States of Jersey since 2002, and was sworn in as a Senator in November 2008. She lost her seat in 2014. In 2016, she was re-elected to the Assembly in a by-election triggered by the resignation of Senator Zoe Cameron.
Ferguson died on 14 September 2022, at the age of 80.<ref></https://www.itv.com/news/channel/2022-09-14/former-jersey-politician-sarah-ferguson-dies </ref>

Education 
She was educated at the University of Manchester, and Columbia Business School in New York City.

Political career 
Ferguson was first sworn into the States on 12 December 2002 as a Deputy for St Brelade.  She was re-elected in 2005, and elected as a Senator for the first time in 2008. She lost her seat in the 2014 elections. She was returned to office in September 2016 to complete Senator Cameron's term through to May 2018.

References

1940s births
Year of birth missing
2022 deaths
21st-century British women politicians
Columbia Business School alumni
Deputies of Jersey
Jersey women in politics
Senators of Jersey
People from Saint Brélade